The 1974 Calder Cup playoffs of the American Hockey League began on April 3, 1974. The eight teams that qualified played best-of-seven series for Division Semifinals and Finals. The division champions played a best-of-seven series for the Calder Cup.  The Calder Cup Final ended on May 8, 1974, with the Hershey Bears defeating the Providence Reds four games to one to win the Calder Cup for the fifth time in team history.

Richmond and Baltimore tied the AHL playoff record for highest scoring shutout in game 2 of their Southern division semifinal, which Richmond won 10-0.

Playoff seeds
After the 1973–74 AHL regular season, the top three teams from each division qualified for the playoffs. The Rochester Americans finished the regular season with the best overall record.

Northern Division
Rochester Americans - 97 points
Providence Reds - 88 points
Nova Scotia Voyageurs - 86 points
New Haven Nighthawks - 80 points

Southern Division
Baltimore Clippers - 94 points
Hershey Bears - 92 points
Cincinnati Swords - 91 points
Richmond Robins - 58 points

Bracket

In each round, the team that earned more points during the regular season receives home ice advantage, meaning they receive the "extra" game on home-ice if the series reaches the maximum number of games. There is no set series format due to arena scheduling conflicts and travel considerations.

Division Semifinals 
Note: Home team is listed first.

Northern Division

(1) Rochester Americans vs. (4) New Haven Nighthawks

(2) Providence Reds vs. (3) Nova Scotia Voyageurs

Southern Division

(1) Baltimore Clippers vs. (4) Richmond Robins

(2) Hershey Bears vs. (3) Cincinnati Swords

Division Finals

Northern Division

(2) Providence Reds vs. (4) New Haven Nighthawks

Southern Division

(1) Baltimore Clippers vs. (2) Hershey Bears

Calder Cup Final

(S2) Hershey Bears vs. (N2) Providence Reds

See also
1973–74 AHL season
List of AHL seasons

References

Calder Cup
Calder Cup playoffs